The 2018 F4 Chinese Championship (Shell Cup FIA F4 Chinese Championship) was the fourth season of the F4 Chinese Championship. It began on 13 May at the Ningbo International Circuit and finished on 14 October at the same place after seven triple header rounds, all of them co-hosted with the China Formula Grand Prix championship.

Teams and drivers

Race calendar and results
All rounds will be held in China.

Championship standings
Points were awarded as follows:

Drivers' Championship

Teams' Cup

References

External links 

  

F4 Chinese Championship seasons
Chinese
F4 Championship
Chinese F4